Ngeno Kipngetich (born 17 August 2000) is a Kenyan middle-distance runner specialising in the 800 metres. He represented his country at the 2019 World Championships, advancing to the semifinals. In addition, he won a silver medal at the 2018 IAAF World U20 Championships.

International competitions

Personal bests
Outdoor
800 metres – 1:44.57 (Nairobi 2019)
Indoor
800 metres – 1:48.84 (Val-de-Reuil 2019)

References

2000 births
Living people
Kenyan male middle-distance runners
World Athletics Championships athletes for Kenya
21st-century Kenyan people